The women's trampoline competition at the 2018 Asian Games took place on 30 August 2018 at the Jakarta International Expo Hall D2.

Schedule
All times are Western Indonesia Time (UTC+07:00)

Results

Qualification

Final

References

External links
Results

Women's trampoline